Descent To The Surface is the second album by rock group Sweethead. It was released on April 8, 2016 and is the follow up to their 2009 self titled debut album. For the recording of the album, band members Serrina and Troy Van Leeuwen are joined by an array of guest musicians.

Track listing

Personnel
Personnel adapted from Descent To The Surface liner notes.

Band
Serrina Sims - vocals, war drums
Troy Van Leeuwen - guitars, keys, sequencing, percussion, bass, backing vocals, moog, piano, moog lap steel, war drums

Additional appearances
Jonathan Hischke - bass
Norm Block - drums
Jon Theodore - drums, shaman drum, cümbüş
Dean Fertita - keys
Jeff Friedl - drums
Nathan Connolly - guitars, backing vocals
Mike Zarin - bass
Antoine Hajjar - drums
Ben Chisolm - sequencing, keys
Eden Galindo - guitars
Eddie Nappi - bass
Brian O'Connor - bass
Alain Johannes - cig fiddle, cümbüş

Technical personnel
Troy Van Leeuwen - producer, mixing
Sam Bell - mixing
Alain Johannes - mastering, additional engineering
Norm Block - additional engineering
Dave Catching - additional engineering
Johnny McDaid - additional engineering
Eric Rennaker - additional engineering
Serrina - artwork, layout

References

2016 albums
Sweethead albums